The cutting of the elm was a diplomatic altercation between the kings of France and England in 1188, during which an elm tree near Gisors in Normandy was felled.

Diplomatic significance

In the 12th century, the tree marked the traditional place of Franco-Norman negotiations, as the field was located on the border between Normandy, ruled by the English king, and the royal domains of the French king.

Accounts

One account narrates the meeting between King Henry II of England and King Philip II of France in 1188, following the fall of Jerusalem:
At Gisors, Henry II and his advisers stood under an Elm tree while Philip and his entourage suffered in the full heat of the sun. After the meeting, Philip ordered the tree cut down and hacked to pieces, sending the message that he would offer no quarter to the English.

A quite different account is given by the Minstrel of Rheims (c. 1260), a thirteenth-century historical fiction:
King Richard sent a message to the counts of Sancerre and of Barre, telling them that they took the king's bread and gave him nothing in return but if they were brave enough to come to the elm tree at Gisors, he would consider them truly courageous. The French nobles sent the message back that they would come the next day, at the third hour, to cut the tree down, in spite of him. When the English king heard that they were coming to cut down the tree, he had the trunk reinforced with bands of iron, that were wrapped five times around it. The next morning the French nobles armed themselves, and assembled five squadrons of their men, one of which was led by the count of Sancerre, another by the count of Chartres, the third by the count of Vendôme, the fourth by the count of Nevers, and the fifth by Sir William of Barre and Sir Alain of Roucy. They rode up to the elm tree at Gisors, with the crossbowmen and carpenters out front, and they had in their hands sharp axes and good pointed hammers, with which to cut the bands that were fastened around the tree. They stopped at the elm tree, tore off the bands, and cut it down, in spite of all resistance.

Popular culture

The event has been used in the history proposed by Pierre Plantard and other pseudo-historical theories. In this context, the Cutting of the elm was portrayed as marking the split between the Knights Templar and the Priory of Sion.

See also
 List of individual trees

Notes

External links
A Thirteenth-Century Minstrel's Chronicle, a translation by Robert Levine of the Récits d'un ménestrel de Reims, a thirteenth-century historical fiction, Mellen Press, Lewiston, 1990.
Smith, Bradford, The Foundations of the West - Course Material, Chapter 8 The Age of the Crusades - The Rise of France under Philip Augustus and of St. Louis Oglethorpe University, Summer 2000.
Vincent, Nicholas, "William Marshal, King Henry II and the Honour of Chateauroux", in: Archives: The Journal of the British Record Association vol. 25, no. 102 (2000).
Lindsay Diggelmann, "Hewing the Ancient Elm: Anger, Arboricide, and Medieval Kingship", Journal of Medieval and Early Modern Studies, 40, 2, 2010, pp. 249–72. http://jmems.dukejournals.org/content/40/2/249.abstract

    

Individual elm trees
Duchy of Normandy
France–United Kingdom relations
Priory of Sion hoax
12th century in international relations
1180s in France
1188 in England